The rufous-chested tanager (Thlypopsis ornata) is a species of bird in the family Thraupidae.

Distribution and habitat
It is found in  Ecuador, Peru and southwestern Colombia.  Its natural habitats are subtropical or tropical moist montane forests, subtropical or tropical high-altitude shrubland, and heavily degraded former forest.

References

rufous-chested tanager
Birds of the Ecuadorian Andes
Birds of the Peruvian Andes
rufous-chested tanager
rufous-chested tanager
Taxonomy articles created by Polbot